Thomas Whittaker (25 September 1856 – 3 October 1935) was an English metaphysician and critic.

Biography

Whittaker was educated at Dublin Royal College of Science and Exeter College, Oxford. He was an editor of the journal Mind (1885-1891). He won a Natural Science scholarship at Exeter College. From 1910 he was director of the Rationalist Press Association.

Whittaker was an advocate of the Christ myth theory. He was influenced by the writings of Willem Christiaan van Manen and J. M. Robertson.

Works
 The Philosophy of History (1893)
 The Neoplatonists: A Study in the History of Hellenism (1901), third impression 1928
 Origins of Christianity (1904), fourth edition 1933
 Apollonius of Tyana and Other Essays (1906)
 The Liberal State (1907)
 Priests, Philosophers, and Prophets (1911)
 The Theory of Abstract Ethics (1916)
 The Metaphysics of Evolution (1926)
 His Prolegomena to a New Metaphysic (1931)
 Reason (1934)

He wrote several lives for the Dictionary of National Biography, signing as T. W-r.
 Thomas Bedwell
 William Bewley
 John Bonnycastle
 Henry Briggs (1561–1630)

References

Further reading
 “Whittaker, Thomas,” in Alumni Oxonienses: the Members of the University of Oxford, 1715-1886 by Foster, Joseph, Oxford: Parker and Co., 1888–1892.
 The Times, 1935, Obituary: Thomas Whittaker. Metaphysician and critic

External links

 
 
 

1856 births
1935 deaths
Christ myth theory proponents
Critics of Christianity
English critics
English sceptics
Metaphysicians